Gorytvesica ebenoptera is a species of moth of the family Tortricidae. It is found in Morona-Santiago Province, Ecuador.

The wingspan is 14.5 mm for males and 17 mm for females. The wings are dark brown, in the distal third tinged rust with weak brown strigulation (fine streaks). The hindwings are blackish brown.

Etymology
The species name refers to the dark, brown colouration of the species and is derived from Latin/Greek ebenus (meaning ebony) and pteron (meaning wing).

References

Moths described in 2005
Euliini
Moths of South America
Taxa named by Józef Razowski